The Bard Springs Bathhouse is a historic recreational support facility in Ouachita National Forest.  It is located at the Bard Springs recreation site, southeast of Mena and north of Athens in Polk County, off County Road 82 and Forest Road 106 on the banks of Blaylock Creek.  It is a single story rustic stone structure, with entrances at either end into open areas for changing.  The interior is lit by skylights in the roof.  It was built in 1936 by a crew of the Civilian Conservation Corps, and is one of four surviving CCC structures (the others are two dams and a picnic shelter) in the immediate area.

The bathhouse was listed on the National Register of Historic Places in 1993.

See also
National Register of Historic Places listings in Polk County, Arkansas

References

Public baths on the National Register of Historic Places in Arkansas
Buildings and structures completed in 1936
Buildings and structures in Polk County, Arkansas
Ouachita National Forest
National Register of Historic Places in Polk County, Arkansas
1936 establishments in Arkansas